A tranquilizer is a drug that is designed for the treatment of anxiety, fear, tension, agitation, and disturbances of the mind, specifically to reduce states of anxiety and tension.

Etymology
Tranquilizer, as a term, was first used by F.F. Yonkman (1953), from the conclusions of investigative studies using the drug reserpine, which showed the drug had a calming effect on all animals to which it was administered. Reserpine is a centrally acting Rauwolfia alkaloid. The word directly refers to the state of tranquillity in a person and other animals.

The term is considered popular or common, meaning it is not generally in use in the field of medicine. Specifically, it is used in reference to antipsychotic or neuroleptic medications.

The term is generally used as a synonym for sedative. When used by health care professionals, it is usually qualified or replaced with more precise terms:
 minor tranquilizer usually refers to anxiolytics.
 major tranquilizer might refer to antipsychotics.

Mood stabilizers might also be considered to belong to the classification of tranquilizing agents.

Use on non-human animals
Tranquilizers are administered to animals via dart gun. If the animal only needs to be safely approached, the dart will contain a minor tranquilizer. Minor tranquilizers relieve tension and anxiety without affecting consciousness. If the animal needs to be completely still and unable to feel pain, a major tranquilizer will be used.

Police use
Tranquilizer darts are not generally included in police less-than-lethal arsenals because a human can easily be wrestled to the ground, the pain induced by the dart may cause a suspect to pull out a weapon or panic and run until they are far away resulting in the officer having to track down the unconscious suspect, a human can have a deadly allergic reaction to a tranquilizer, and because effective use requires an estimate of the target's weight —- too little tranquilizer will have no effect, and too much tranquilizer will result in death, which can lead to being convicted of second-degree unintentional murder if the target is a human. "If you shot somebody that was small, it could kill them. If you shot somebody who was big or had drugs in their system, it might not do anything." says Newett, of the Justice Department.

See also
 Sedative
 Tranquilizer gun

References

Drug classes defined by psychological effects